George Hopkins Williams Jr. (April 7, 1915 – July 9, 2006) was an insurance executive who created the George H. Williams World War I Aviation Collection at McDermott Library at The University of Texas at Dallas.

Early life 
He was born in Frost, Texas on April 7, 1915, and had three siblings: Max Williams; Emily Williams Tooker; and Ralph Williams. He spent his youth in Waco, Texas and graduated from Baylor University in 1939. He was a veteran of World War II and attended Harvard University to study radio and electronics, and was reassigned to the 94th Signal Battalion with General Patton's Third Army in relief of Bastogne during the Battle of the Bulge. He was also at Remagen.

Personal life 
He married Ginny Butcher and had the following children: Holly A. Williams Hays (1944-2004); Kaye Williams Peterson; and Scott Williams. He had 7 grandchildren and 7 great grandchildren.

He worked in the mortgage loan division at Equitable Life insurance in Dallas. He assembled considerable material that became the cornerstone of the University of Texas at Dallas.

Career 
Williams organized and served as president of the League of World War I Aviation Historians and started the group’s publication, "Over the Front". He organized a seminar for the League of World War I Aviation Historians at University of Texas at Dallas in 1988. The last three living U.S. flying aces from World War I attended.

Death and legacy 
He died on July 9, 2006, at his home in Dallas.

Selected works 
Skelton, Marvin L., and George Hopkins Williams. Lt. Henry R. Clay: Sopwith Camel Ace. [Richardson, Tex.]: University of Texas at Dallas, History of Aviation Collection, 1998.

References

External links
University of Texas
Obituary

Businesspeople in insurance
Historians of aviation
Baylor University alumni
Harvard University alumni
University of Texas at Dallas people
1915 births
2006 deaths
People from Navarro County, Texas